Corybas fimbriatus, commonly known as the fringed helmet orchid, is a species of terrestrial orchid endemic to eastern Australia. It has a broad egg-shaped to round leaf and a dark reddish purple to crimson flower with translucent patches. It is similar to C. hispidus but its labellum lacks a creamy-white centre and is not covered with bristly hairs.

Description 
The leaf is dark green on the upper surface and silvery green on the lower side. There is a single dark reddish purple to crimson flower with translucent patches. Flowering occurs from May to August.

Taxonomy 
The fringed helmet orchid was first formally described in 1810 by Robert Brown and given the name Corysanthes fimbriatus. The description was published in Brown's book Prodromus Florae Novae Hollandiae et Insulae Van Diemen. In 1871 Heinrich Gustav Reichenbach changed the name to Corybas fimbriatus. The specific epithet (fimbriatus) is a Latin word meaning "fringed" or "fibrous".

Distribution and habitat
Corybas fimbriatus is widespread and common, growing in heath and moist forest. It occurs in Queensland south from Gympie, on the coast and ranges of New South Wales, in south-east Victoria and in Tasmania.  There is also an isolated population on the Atherton Tableland.

Use in horticulture
Although usually only cultivated by orchid enthusiasts, C. fimbriatus is more easily grown than other orchids in the same genus. It is grown in a free draining, sandy mix and requires good air circulation with 50% sun.

References

External links 
 

fimbriatus
Endemic orchids of Australia
Orchids of New South Wales
Orchids of Queensland
Orchids of the Australian Capital Territory
Orchids of Victoria (Australia)
Orchids of Tasmania
Plants described in 1810